Galina Rodionovna Lukashenko, née Zhelnerovich is the wife of the Belarusian President, Alexander Lukashenko and is the current First Lady of Belarus. 

Galina is estranged from Alexander who has had at least one extra-marital affair that produced a son, Nikolai in 2004.

Biography
She was born on 1 January 1955 in the family of Rodion Georgievich Zhelnerovich (1928-1983) from Brest and Elena Fedorovna Zhelnerovich (1929-2019) from Slutsk. She met Alexander Lukashenko while still in high school in the village of Ryzhkovichi, and married him in 1975, upon graduation from the Mogilev State Pedagogical Institute (now Mogilev State A. Kuleshov University).

She did not move with her husband to Minsk at the beginning of his presidential career, instead living on Zemlyanichnaya Street in Shklow, where she has since lived. She does not accompany her husband at public events and rarely sees with him. One of the earlier moments when the couple was seen together was the year Lukashenko was elected, when he was on a state visit to Israel.

Sanctions
On 15 March 2022, Galina Lukashenka was added to the US Treasury sanctions list - designated under Executive Order 13405 for "being a senior-level official who is responsible for or has engaged in public corruption related to Belarus". On 25 March 2022, she was sanctioned by Australia.

References 

1955 births
Living people
First ladies of Belarus
Galina
20th-century Belarusian people
20th-century Belarusian women
21st-century Belarusian people
21st-century Belarusian women
Mogilev State A. Kuleshov University alumni
Belarusian individuals subject to the U.S. Department of the Treasury sanctions
Specially Designated Nationals and Blocked Persons List